Margaret Denise Quigley (Vietnamese: Lý Mỹ Kỳ; born May 22, 1979), professionally known as Maggie Q, is an American actress, activist, and model.

She began her professional career in Hong Kong, with starring roles in the action films Gen-Y Cops (2000) and Naked Weapon (2002), before appearing in the American productions Mission: Impossible III (2006), Live Free or Die Hard (2007), Priest (2011) and The Protégé (2021). She portrayed Tori Wu in the dystopian science-fiction action film Divergent (2014), and reprised her role in the sequels, Insurgent (2015) and Allegiant (2016).

Q starred in the title role on The CW action-thriller series Nikita (2010–2013), and also had a main role as FBI Special Agent Hannah Wells in the political thriller series Designated Survivor (2016–19). She provided the voice of Wonder Woman on the animated series Young Justice (2012–19).

Early life
Q was born and raised in Honolulu, Hawaii. Her father is of Irish and Polish descent and her mother is a Vietnamese immigrant. Her parents met while her father was stationed in Vietnam during the Vietnam War. She has four siblings, was raised Catholic and attends church.

She attended Mililani Waena Elementary School and Wheeler Intermediate School. She then attended Mililani High School, where she was on the cross country, track and field, and swim teams. She won the title of "Best Body" senior year, and graduated in 1997. She won an athletics scholarship to a private university and intended to study veterinary science; however, her family was unable to assist her financially. She left Hawaii at the end of one school year in hopes of earning enough money to resume at the beginning of the next one.

Career

1996–2005: Modeling and Hong Kong films 
At a friend's suggestion, Q began modeling in Tokyo, Japan at the age of 17, before making an unsuccessful move to Taipei, Taiwan. She tried again in Hong Kong, where she began using the stage name Maggie Q because the locals could not pronounce Quigley properly. She has said it was not easy for her: "I had twenty bucks in my pocket. I mean, I literally did the same thing that my mother did when she left Vietnam... didn't speak the language... had no money." But in Hong Kong she became a protégé of Jackie Chan, who saw in her a potential action star. His intensive training taught her the importance of professionalism and always doing her own stunts. She later said, "I had never done a day of martial arts in my life when I started in the business. I couldn't even touch my toes."

In 1998, she started her acting career in the TV drama House of the Dragon, which was a huge hit in Asia. In 2000, she made her film debut as Anna in the horror film Model from Hell, and went on to star as FBI agent Jane Quigley in the action thriller Gen-Y Cops that year. Her appearance in Gen-Y Cops impressed Chan so much that he cast her in his films Manhattan Midnight and Rush Hour 2.

In 2002, she starred as martial artist assassin Charlene Ching in the action film Naked Weapon. In 2004 she co-starred with Kelly Hu, Russell Wong and other Asian-American actors in a 30-second PSA produced by Mark Allen for CAUSE USA (Center for Asian Americans United for Self Empowerment), The Least Likely, encouraging Asian and Pacific Islander Americans to register and vote. In 2005, she played Harmony in the German-Singaporean TV mini-series House of Harmony, opposite Fann Wong, and co-produced the animal treatment documentary Earthlings narrated by Joaquin Phoenix.

2006–2013: Hollywood career and Nikita

In 2006, Q made her Hollywood breakthrough as co-star in Mission: Impossible III alongside Tom Cruise. She played Zhen, the only female member of the IMF team. In 2007, she appeared as Mai Linh in the Bruce Willis movie Live Free or Die Hard, the fourth film in the Die Hard series, and as Maggie in Balls of Fury. In 2008, she played fictional Cao Ying, a granddaughter of the warlord Cao Cao in Three Kingdoms: Resurrection of the Dragon, her first ancient Chinese costume performance. That year, she also appeared in the drama/thriller movie Deception starring Ewan McGregor and Hugh Jackman, as Tina, an investment banker who introduces Jackman's character to an exclusive anonymous sex club list. She also stars in the video game Need for Speed: Undercover as the seductive lead character, federal agent Chase Linh, the player's only contact to the Tri-City Police.

In 2010, Q became the lead character, an assassin gone rogue, on the CW series Nikita, based on the 1990 French film of the same name. Since its premiere, she has been incorrectly described as the first Asian American series lead in an American television drama. (Actress Anna May Wong was the first Asian American series lead of an American television series with her show The Gallery of Madame Liu-Tsong, which aired in 1951.) Q received mostly positive reviews for her role in the series. Her character was included in TV Guides lists of "TV's Sexiest Crime Fighters" and "TV's Toughest Ladies".

2014–present
In 2014, Q played the role of Dauntless faction member Tori Wu, in the film Divergent, the adaptation of the same-titled novel. Q reprised her role in the sequel to Divergent, The Divergent Series: Insurgent, which began filming on May 27, 2014, and was released on March 20, 2015. She also starred in the CBS drama series Stalker by Kevin Williamson as Detective Beth Davis along with Dylan McDermott and Mariana Klaveno. The series premiered on October 1, 2014, for the 2014–15 fall television season. The series was ordered for a full season on October 27, 2014. The series however was canceled after one season, leaving the show on a cliffhanger. In October 2013, Q started filming for The Crash, starring alongside Frank Grillo, AnnaSophia Robb, Dianna Agron, John Leguizamo, Ed Westwick, Mary McCormack, Christopher McDonald and Minnie Driver. The film was directed by Aram Rappaport and produced by Hilary Shor, Atit Shah and Aaron Becker. The Crash had a direct-to-VOD and limited release on January 13, 2017, in North America.

She reprised her role in The Divergent Series: Allegiant, the third installment of the Divergent series, which was released on March 18, 2016. In February 2016, it was announced that she would co-star opposite Kiefer Sutherland in the ABC drama series Designated Survivor as Hannah Wells, a leading FBI agent. The show was renewed by Netflix for a third and final season, which was released on June 7, 2019. However, her character was killed off early in the final season.

In December 2020, she portrayed Sarah in the upcoming Fox comedy series Pivoting.

She starred as an assassin in The Protégé, an action film featuring Samuel L. Jackson and Michael Keaton, which was released to theaters August 20, 2021.

Personal life
After meeting her Stalker co-star Dylan McDermott on-set in early 2014, their engagement was announced on January 14, 2015. They stated in 2017 that they were not in any rush to be married. They ended their relationship in February 2019.

Q has five tattoos: a cross on her right forearm; Tibetan script and a little triangle on her left forearm; a Zulu proverb on her side—"umuntu ngumuntu ngabantu", which means "a person's character is made by the collective"; and one of a phoenix on her left hip, which she has had to conceal for most of her roles except Nikita. She suffered temporary hearing loss in her right ear after her eardrum was damaged during an explosive stunt in 2010.

She owns a house in Pound Ridge, New York.

Animal rights activism
Q is outspoken on the subject of animal rights and has taken part in PETA Asia's campaigns promoting vegetarianism. A vegetarian for many years, she has said that giving up meat was one of the most rewarding decisions she has ever made. "I feel better, I have more energy, on and off the set, and I have the satisfaction of knowing that I'm doing something to help stop animal suffering." In 2008, she was named PETA Asia-Pacific's Person of the Year, and PETA listed her as one of the Best-Dressed Celebrities of 2008. She has since taken the step to cut all animal products from her diet by becoming a vegan. PETA named her one of their three Sexiest Vegans of 2017. She is currently an ambassador for Animals Asia Foundation.

Filmography

Film

Television

Video games

Music videos

As producer

Awards and nominations

References

External links

 
 
 

1979 births
20th-century American actresses
21st-century American actresses
Actresses from Honolulu
Actresses of Vietnamese descent
American expatriates in Hong Kong
American female models
American film actresses
American models of Vietnamese descent
American people of Irish descent
American people of Polish descent
American television actresses
American voice actresses
Hong Kong film actresses
Hong Kong female models
Living people
People from Pound Ridge, New York
American veganism activists
People from Studio City, Los Angeles
American born Hong Kong artists
American expatriate actors in Hong Kong